The 2022 VFL Women's season was the sixth season of the VFL Women's (VFLW).

The season consisted of 14 games for each of the 12 clubs, all of whom returned from the 2021 VFL Women's season. For the first time, all matches were available to watch via the AFL website/app or the VFL/VFLW YouTube channel.

Clubs

Ladder

Finals series
Match-ups set using the second McIntyre final six system.

Qualifying and elimination finals

Semi finals

Preliminary final

Grand final

Awards
 Lambert-Pearce Medal (Best and Fairest):   Georgia Nanscawen – 33 votes
 Rohenna Young Medal (Leading Goal kicker):  Federica Frew – 29 goals
 Debbie Lee Medal (Rising Star): Tahlia Fellows
 Coaches MVP: Georgia Nanscawen
 Coach of the Year: Brendan Major
 Lisa Hardeman Medal (Best on ground VFL Women's Grand Final):  Alana Barba

Club best and fairest winners

See also
 2022 VFL season

References

External links
 Official website

 
V